Joseph Campbell Jr. (born December 28, 1966) is a former American football defensive end. He played for the San Diego Chargers in 1988-1989.

References

1966 births
Living people
American football defensive ends
New Mexico State Aggies football players
San Diego Chargers players